Now That's What I Call Music! 63 may refer to:

 Now That's What I Call Music! 63 (UK series)
 Now That's What I Call Music! 63 (U.S. series)